William H. McLellan (November 25, 1832 – March 25, 1912) was an American lawyer and politician who served as the 24th Attorney General of Maine for less than one year in 1879 out of the two-year term implemented by the Maine Constitution. During his tenure he lobbied the Governor and state legislature to enact criminal justice reform that would have removed a legal mechanism at the time which allowed prisoners to choose which judges would set their bail, as well as removing the right of spousal privilege.

Before becoming Attorney General, McLellan was an active politician in Maine. He was a member of the Maine State Senate in 1872. He was a delegate to Democratic National Convention from Maine in 1876. That same year, he unsuccessfully ran in Maine's 5th Congressional District, losing to the Republican incumbent, Eugene Hale.

References 

1832 births
1912 deaths
People from Skowhegan, Maine
Maine Democrats
Maine Attorneys General
People from Belfast, Maine